The Lodger is a 1944 American horror film about Jack the Ripper, based on the 1913 novel of the same name by Marie Belloc Lowndes. It stars Merle Oberon, George Sanders, and Laird Cregar, features Sir Cedric Hardwicke, and was directed by John Brahm from a screenplay by Barré Lyndon.

Lowndes' story had previously been filmed  by Alfred Hitchcock in 1927 as a silent film, The Lodger: A Story of the London Fog, and by Maurice Elvey with sound in 1932 as The Lodger. It was remade again in 1953 by Hugo Fregonese as Man in the Attic, starring Jack Palance, and again in 2009 by David Ondaatje.

Plot
Slade, a serial killer, is a lodger in a 19th-century family's London home. So is a singer, Kitty Langley, who definitely has caught Slade's eye.

Women are being brutally killed in the Whitechapel district. Scotland Yard is investigating, and a detective, John Warwick, begins to cast his suspicions in Slade's direction. Kitty, meanwhile, has also developed an attraction to Slade.

Slade goes to see her perform at a cabaret. He goes backstage afterward, and tries to make her his next victim, but Warwick's men get there just in time. Unwilling to be taken into police custody, Slade flees to the riverbank, and leaps to his death.

Cast
 Merle Oberon as Kitty Langley (singing voice was dubbed by Lorraine Elliott)
 Laird Cregar as Mr. Slade, the lodger
 George Sanders as Inspector John Warwick
 Sir Cedric Hardwicke as Robert Bonting
 Sara Allgood as Ellen Bonting
 Aubrey Mather as Superintendent Sutherland
 Queenie Leonard as Daisy, the maid
 Doris Lloyd as Jennie
 David Clyde as Sergeant Bates  
 Helena Pickard as Annie Rowley
 Ted Billings as News Vendor (uncredited) 
 Cyril Delevanti as Stagehand (uncredited) 
 Stuart Holmes as King Edward (uncredited)
 Olaf Hytten as Harris (uncredited)

Reception

Box office
The film made a profit of $657,700.

Critical
The New York Times gave the film a positive review: "If The Lodger was designed to chill the spine—as indeed it must have been, considering all the mayhem Mr. Cregar is called upon to commit as the mysterious, psychopathic pathologist of the title—then something is wrong with the picture. But, if it was intended as a sly travesty on the melodramatic technique of ponderously piling suspicion upon suspicion (and wrapping the whole in a cloak of brooding photographic effects), then The Lodger is eminently successful." Variety wrote: "With a pat cast, keen direction, and tight scripting, 20th-Fox has an absorbing and, at times, spine-tingling drama". TV Guide rated it 4/5 stars, and wrote: "Cregar is absolutely chilling in this Jack the Ripper tale, perhaps the best film made about Bloody Jack."

See also
List of American films of 1944

References

External links
 
 
 
 
 

20th Century Fox films
1944 films
1940s historical horror films
1940s serial killer films
1944 horror films
American historical horror films
American black-and-white films
Film noir
Films based on British novels
Films based on horror novels
Films based on works by Marie Adelaide Belloc Lowndes
Films directed by John Brahm
Films scored by Hugo Friedhofer
Films set in London
Films set in the Victorian era
Films about Jack the Ripper
American serial killer films
1940s American films